Kervin Mario Andrade Navarro (born 13 April 2005) is a Venezuelan footballer who plays as a forward for Deportivo La Guaira.

Club career
In September 2022, he was named by English newspaper The Guardian as one of the best players born in 2005 worldwide.

Career statistics

Club

Notes

References

2005 births
Living people
People from Ciudad Guayana
Venezuelan footballers
Association football forwards
Venezuelan Primera División players
Deportivo La Guaira players